Walters Peak is a sharp peak, 2,430 m, on the spur descending the north slope of Wisconsin Range between Faure Peak and Lentz Buttress. Mapped by United States Geological Survey (USGS) from surveys and U.S. Navy air photos, 1960–64. Named by Advisory Committee on Antarctic Names (US-ACAN) for Lieutenant Commander Robert E. Walters, U.S. Navy, a member of the McMurdo Station winter party, 1960.

Mountains of Marie Byrd Land